Gugubera (Koko Pera), or Kok-Kaper, is a Paman language of the Cape York Peninsula, Queensland in Australia

References

External links 
 Paradisec open access collection of vocabulary in Gugubera.
 Paradisec open access collection of recordings in several languages including Gugubera.
 Paradisec collection of recordings in Gugubera.

Southwestern Paman languages
Endangered indigenous Australian languages in Queensland
Severely endangered languages